Slate Mountain may refer to:

Slate Mountain (Nevada), a summit
Slate Mountain, North Carolina, an unincorporated community